Guilherme Clezar and Alejandro González were the defending champions but only González chose to defend his title, partnering Luis David Martínez. González lost in the first round to Chen Ti and Bradley Mousley.

Joe Salisbury and Jackson Withrow won the title after defeating Marcel Felder and Go Soeda 4–6, 6–3, [10–6] in the final.

Seeds

Draw

References
 Main Draw

Challenger Banque Nationale de Granby
Challenger de Granby